Pereyra is a surname, a variant of Perera.

Pereyra may also refer to:
Comet Pereyra (formal designations: C/1963 R1, 1963 V, and 1963e) was a bright comet which appeared in 1963
Pereyra, Buenos Aires, in Berazategui Partido, Buenos Aires Province.

See also

Perera